"Ask the Lonely" is a song by American rock band Journey. Featured in the film Two of a Kind and its respective soundtrack, it was a radio rock hit in the U.S. (despite only receiving a single release in Japan) and appears on their 1988 Greatest Hits album. The single was backed with "Troubled Child", a track from their 1983 album Frontiers. CD reissues of said album feature "Ask the Lonely" as a bonus track.

The track reached number 3 on the Billboard Mainstream Rock Airplay chart (then named "Top Rock Tracks") in January 1984.

Track listing

 "Ask the Lonely" (Perry, Cain) – 3:56
 "Troubled Child" (Cain, Schon, Perry) – 4:29

Personnel

Steve Perry - vocals
Neal Schon - guitar, vocals
Jonathan Cain - keyboards, vocals
Ross Valory - bass, vocals
Steve Smith - drums

Charts

References

Journey (band) songs
1983 songs
Song recordings produced by Mike Stone (record producer)
Songs written by Steve Perry
Songs written by Jonathan Cain
MCA Records singles
Sony Music Entertainment Japan singles